Upaharam is a 1985 Indian Malayalam film,  directed by Sajan and produced by Shaji Joseph and Rajan Joseph. The film stars Mammootty, Rahman (actor), Shobhana, Srividya and Sukumari in the lead roles. The film has musical score by Johnson.

Cast

Mammootty as Dr. Jeevan Thomas
Rahman as Ajith
Shobhana as Maggi Fernadas
Srividya as Sarojiniamma
Sukumari
Thilakan as Divakaran
Jose Prakash as Fernandez
Santhosh as Vinod
Jalaja as Dr. Roopa
Kunchan as Khadher
Lalu Alex as Tony Cheiyan/ Achayan
Mala Aravindan as Sunderashan
Venu Puthalathu

Soundtrack
The music was composed by Johnson and the lyrics were written by Shibu Chakravarthy.

References

External links
 

1985 films
1980s Malayalam-language films
Films directed by Sajan